Karmakshy is a district of Kyzylorda Region in southern Kazakhstan. The administrative center of the district is the urban-type settlement of Zhosaly. Population:

References

Districts of Kazakhstan
Kyzylorda Region